The Germanic first name Thorleif (which means son of Thor) with variants Torleif (Swedish), Thorleiv/Torleiv (Norwegian) and Þorleif (Icelandic) may refer to:

Torleif
Torleif Torkildsen (1892–1944), Norwegian gymnast and Olympian

Torleiv
Torleiv Trondson Benkestok Norwegian nobleman (beginning of 16th century)
Torleiv Bolstad (1915–1979), Norwegian musician and Hardanger fiddle player
Torleiv Corneliussen (1890–1975), Norwegian sailor and Olympian
Torleiv Hannaas (1874–1929), Norwegian philologist
Torleiv Maseng (born 1946), Norwegian engineer
Torleiv Ole Rognum (born 1948), Norwegian physician and politician for the Christian Democratic Party

Thorleiv
Thorleiv Røhn (1881–1963), Norwegian gymnast who won a gold medal in the team competition at the 1906 Summer Olympics

Thorleif
Thorleif Andresen (born  1945), Norwegian cyclist who competed at the 1976 Summer Olympics
Thorleif Christoffersen (1900–1975), Norwegian sailor who competed in the 1920 Summer Olympics
Thorleif Enger (born 1943), Norwegian businessperson and chief executive officer of Yara International
Thorleif Haug (1894–1934), Norwegian skier who competed in Nordic combined and cross-country
Thorleif Holbye (1883–1963), Norwegian sailor who competed in the 1920 Summer Olympics
Gunnar Thorleif Hvashovd (born 1924), Norwegian politician for the Labour Party
Thorleif Karlsen (1909–2010), Norwegian police inspector, who also became known through the radio program Trafikk og musikk
Thorleif Kristensen (1916–1997), Norwegian politician for the Labour Party
Thorleif Lund (1880–1956), Norwegian stage and film actor of the silent film era
Thorleif Lintrup Paus (1912–2006), Norwegian lawyer and diplomat
Thorleif Rattray Orde Mangin (1896–1950), British colonial administrator
Thorleif Petersen (1884–1958), Norwegian gymnast who competed in the 1906 Summer Olympics
Thorleif T. Peterson (1885–1982), American farmer and politician
Ola Thorleif Ruud (1926–2018), Norwegian politician from the Conservative Party
Thorleif Schjelderup (1920–2006), Norwegian author and in the 1940s and 1950s one of Norway's best ski jumpers
Thorleif Frederik Schjelderup (1859–1931), Norwegian businessperson
Thorleif Schjelderup-Ebbe (1894–1982), Norwegian zoologist who described the pecking order of hens
Thorleif Torstensson, leader of Thorleifs, a Swedish dansband active 1962–2012
Thorleif Vangen (1920–1996), Norwegian skier who competed in the 1948 Winter Olympics

See also
Norwegian Academy Prize in memory of Thorleif Dahl

Norwegian masculine given names